Mount Hazor is an irregularly shaped plateau, marking the geographical boundary between Samaria to its north and Judea to its south.

Its name is derived from the word for "courtyard", referring to the walled enclosures that this large land mass enabled ancients to construct. These enclosures served as seasonal pens for sheep that were brought there for shearing, which was accompanied with a festive gathering.
The peak housed a pagan shrine for worship of a Baal (deity) who was considered "lord of the mountain", hence its name: "Baal-hazor".

The Genesis Apocryphon of the Dead Sea scrolls identifies Ramat Hazor as the site between Bethel and Ai where Abraham built an altar and invoked the name of God. At this site the accounts of  took place:

Mountains of the West Bank
Hebrew Bible mountains